XS is a manhwa by Song Ji-Hyung that was serialized in Booking by the Haksan Culture Company and licensed by Dark Horse Comics.

Volumes

References

Further reading

External links 
 XS Volume 1: Hybrid at Dark Horse Comics
 XS엑세스 1권  at Haksan Culture Company 
 

Manhwa titles
Dark Horse Comics titles
Haksan Culture Company titles